Ramsbottom Evangelical Church is a Protestant, Reformed, church situated in the town of Ramsbottom, Greater Manchester, England. The church is a member of the Fellowship of Independent Evangelical Churches, and regularly partners with other like-minded churches in the area such as Chorlton Evangelical Church. It is also involved in active evangelism ministry in the town, including street preaching, door-to-door ministry, a 'Holiday Bible Club' for youngsters, and a periodic Christianity Explored course for older people.

Church History 
The beginnings of Ramsbottom Evangelical Church go back to Summerseat in the late 1950s when the Primitive Methodist Church invited Rev. Raymond Gregory, minister of Dundee Lane Congregational Church to minister to them. The Primitive Methodist building became unsafe due to river erosion and for a period of time the church held their meetings in a car garage on Robin Road.

1961 marked a turning point in the life of the Evangelical Church when younger men were invited to attend a Billy Graham crusade which resulted in a cross pollination of religious ideals from the United States with those of 1960's England.

Later the church moved to the Summerseat Liberal Club and in 1963 to the Summerseat Co-op on a ten-year lease. When the lease on the Co-op building ran out, in 1973, the leaseholders would not re-new the contract. After that the church met in private homes until 1976 when it moved to its present location.

In 1998 Rev. Raymond Gregory retired and was replaced as Minister by Pastor Oliver Allmand-Smith.

External links
 Official Church Site

20th-century Methodist church buildings
Ramsbottom